is a Japanese musician, singer-songwriter and gravure idol. She is managed by Platinum Production and signed to King Records. As a musician she is known for wearing bikinis onstage and for provocative promotional material.

Early life and influences
Ena Fujita was born in Kitakyushu, Fukuoka Prefecture on July 7, 1990. As a child she was inspired to become a singer after performing a Sailor Moon song in front of her family. In October 2005, she won a singing contest in junior high school. As a child she was a fan of pop idols such as Aya Matsuura and Speed. But when she entered the music business she felt it was disingenuous to sing songs that other people wrote and that did not resonate with her, so she vowed to write her own lyrics. When she started playing guitar around 2014, she became more interested in rock music like Number Girl and The Blue Hearts. This was a result of recommendations by her frequent collaborator, Ga-ko Tabuchi.

Career
In June 2006, Fujita started attending the Vanz Entertainment entertainment school in Fukuoka. Her song  was included on the January 2008 omnibus album Vanz Variety Vol. 1. Under the name , she was drummer of the all-female band  for their 2009 single "Wild Berry".

She moved to Tokyo in January 2010, and started attending vocal classes at Watanabe Entertainment College. In October, she made her first regular appearance on the BS Fuji television show Seishun! Imoto no Mon.

Fujita started activities as a gravure idol in October 2012. She admitted that she had a lot of resistance to the move, as she grew up in a family where she was not allowed to look at gravure. Fujita has a darker alter ego named  who is vocalist of Dolce, a faux-English pop band who made their debut in 2013. In January 2014, Fujita won Tokyo Sports Miss TōSupo 2014 grand prix. It was around this time that she combined her bikini modeling with her music, and started to learn guitar as she felt it was wrong to be taking photos with one when she could not actually play it. Fujita released the single "Yumehikousen" on October 29, 2014, via Spacey Music Entertainment.

In August 2016 Fujita starred in the horror film Evil Idol Song and transferred to major record label King Records. That same month she released a mini-album of the same name that includes the film's titular theme song. The album Tsuyome no Shinzō followed a year later in August 2017. Its track "Bikini Riot" is performed under her rapping alter ego . The album was released in Europe by JPU Records under the title Bikini Riot. Fujita was a winner of the 2017 Miss iD idol audition held by Kodansha, and won its Cheerz Award. She and other Miss iD winners appear in the 2018 horror film Vampire Clay, while Fujita also performs its theme song "Watashi Dake ga Inai Sekai".

The single "Ienai Koto wa Uta no Naka" was released in June 2018. Its music video, directed by Yoshihiro Nishimura, was released in two versions as the uncensored one was banned from TV due to its gore. It was followed by "Tsuki ga Tabeteshimatta" in January 2019, which includes a cover of The Pillows' 1996 single "Trip Dancer". Fujita also appears in Ōsama ni nare, a film celebrating The Pillows' 30th anniversary. Her album Iromono was released in June 2019. Nishimura expanded Fujita's 2018 music video "Ienai Koto wa Uta no Naka" into the October 2019 feature film Welcome to Japan: Hinomaru Lunch Box, which the musician also stars in.

Fujita's June 2020 single "Dead Stroke" is the ending theme song to the second season of the anime adaptation of Baki. The song's music video was delayed not only because of the COVID-19 pandemic in Japan, but also due to the death of professional wrestler Hana Kimura, who was set to co-star in it.

In October 2021, Fujita cancelled two concerts due to both physical and mental exhaustion. In June 2022, Shūkan Bunshun reported that Fujita had married Kenta Tokui of the comedy duo Heisei Nobushi Kobushi earlier that spring. On September 3, 2022, Fujita announced on her blog that she had given birth to her first child.

Discography
Studio albums

Singles

Home videos

Filmography
Image videos

Films

References

External links
 Official website
 Dolce official website

1990 births
Living people
Musicians from Fukuoka Prefecture
Japanese gravure models
Japanese women rock singers
Japanese women pop singers
Japanese women singer-songwriters
21st-century Japanese women singers
21st-century Japanese singers
Japanese rock guitarists
Women guitarists
King Records (Japan) artists